The AT & SF Roundhouse in Las Vegas, New Mexico, located northeast of Grand Ave., was built in 1917.  It was listed on the National Register of Historic Places in 1985.

It was originally built as a nine-stall train engine roundhouse of the Atchison, Topeka and Santa Fe Railway, and was later enlarged to sixteen stalls in 1899.  The current building is a 34-stall roundhouse which replaced the original in 1917, at cost of about $200,000.

References

Buildings and structures completed in 1917
Buildings and structures in Las Vegas, New Mexico
National Register of Historic Places in San Miguel County, New Mexico
Railway buildings and structures on the National Register of Historic Places in New Mexico
Railway roundhouses on the National Register of Historic Places
Railroad roundhouses in New Mexico